Vaxholm Municipality (Vaxholms kommun or Vaxholms stad) is a municipality within Stockholm archipelago in Stockholm County in east central Sweden. The municipal slogan is "Vaxholm – the capital of the archipelago", due to its central location in the archipelago. Its seat is located in the city of Vaxholm.

From 1974 to 1984 Vaxholm was united with Österåker Municipality, making up a municipality called Vaxholm, but with the seat in Åkersberga. After the "divorce" the new Vaxholm Municipality came out larger than it had been before the amalgamation. The municipality prefers to style itself City of Vaxholm.

64 islets are in the municipality, and also the peninsula Bogesundslandet.

Localities
Kullö, 201 inhabitants (2000)
Oskar-Fredriksborg, 692 inhabitants (2000)
Resarö,  2,079 inhabitants (2000)
Vaxholm, 4,887 inhabitants (2000)
Ytterby (mine), a renowned village

Demography

Population development

Income and Education
The population in Vaxholm Municipality has the 8th highest median income per capita in Sweden. The share of highly educated persons, according to Statistics Sweden's definition: persons with post-secondary education that is three years or longer, is 36.4% (national average: 27.0%) and the 14th highest in the country.

Residents with a foreign background
On the 31st of December 2017 the number of people with a foreign background (persons born outside of Sweden or with two parents born outside of Sweden) was 1 599, or 13.52% of the population (11 831 on the 31st of December 2017). On the 31st of December 2002 the number of residents with a foreign background was (per the same definition) 1 044, or 10.84% of the population (9 631 on the 31st of December 2002). On 31 December 2017 there were 11 831 residents in Vaxholm, of which 1 285 people (10.86%) were born in a country other than Sweden. Divided by country in the table below - the Nordic countries as well as the 12 most common countries of birth outside of Sweden for Swedish residents have been included, with other countries of birth bundled together by continent by Statistics Sweden.

Economy
The municipality has a significant amount of tourism. Ships transporting passengers between the islands began running on a daily basis in the 1850s. Today, many of islands (among them the main island Vaxholm) can also be reached by bridges from the mainland. The tourist boats depart from Stockholm's Slussen.

Gallery

References

External links

Vaxholm Municipality - Official site

 
Municipalities of Stockholm County
Metropolitan Stockholm